The Serb Uprising of 1737–1739 broke out following Austria's defeats against the Ottomans, when the Austrian Emperor issued proclamations that the Christians in the Balkans rise against the Ottoman Empire. The Austrian Emperor called on the Serbs, who were ready to revolt, on 15 June 1737, and stressed that they would fight in an alliance with Russia against a common enemy. The Serbs organized themselves under Serbian Patriarch Arsenije IV. The uprising had a wide geographical extent, from Belgrade to eastern Bosnia and Herzegovina, Montenegro and the Šar Mountain. The Albanian Klimenti tribe also joined the uprising. The failed war prompted Serbs, mostly from Herzegovina, Sandžak, Metohija and Montenegro, to flee under the leadership of Arsenije IV from the Ottoman territories into the Habsburg monarchy (as was done in 1689–92).

Talks
Serbian Patriarch Arsenije IV discussed with the Austrian government through the bishop of Temeschwar, Nikola Dimitrijević. Arsenije promised that the people would revolt and help the Austrian army with food.

The tribes in Brda, under the leadership of Radonja Petrović, would ready 500 armed men of Kuči, vojvoda Vuksan Vojvodić of Vasojevići 200, vojvoda Toško of Piperi 200, etc.

The Serbian Patriarch and Radonja called on Metropolitan Sava Petrović to join the war against the Ottomans, but he was under the influence of the Republic of Venice, and stayed inactive during the war.

Operations

In Serbia
The Serbian Militia operated mostly in central Serbia.

Attack on Užice (1737)
Attack on Lešnica
Liberation of Kruševac (20 July 1737), under the command of Mlatišuma
Retreat to Syrmia (End of October 1737), under the command of Isaković
Attacks in Morava and Rudnik (7 January 1739), under the command of Mlatišuma

The Toplica region and Niš were liberated.

In Montenegro and Old Serbia
Radonja requested from the Austrian feltmarschal that in case the rebels won, they would continue in his service. When talks were underway, an uprising broke out in Montenegro. Radonja's rebels and Serbian troops, and an auxiliary force of Staniša Marković-Mlatišuma, attacked the local Muslims. According to the Serbian plan, they were to take over Novi Pazar, Rožaje, Bijelo Polje and Peć. A Serbian detachment attacked Bihor, and penetrated to Godijevo, where they set up a headquarters in the house of Mustafa Sijarić. Radonja heard that the Ottomans would in their future actions first attack Župljani, which had already crossed to the Venetian side. At the same time, Radonja informed Cattaro intendant Jerolim Buća that Derviš-paša Čengić was ordered to turn with his army from the Sanjak of Herzegovina towards Knin, which they were to attack; and that vezir-Mustafa-paša with the armies of other sanjaks and 4,000 Tatars, as was planned, turn in the direction of Zadar. That information was likely exaggerated.

Second Great Migration

The failed war prompted Serbs, mostly from Herzegovina, Sandžak, Metohija and Montenegro, to flee under the leadership of Arsenije IV from the Ottoman territories into the Habsburg monarchy (as was done in 1689–92). The Austrian government had encouraged the Serbs to settle Habsburg territories.

References

Sources

Further reading

Conflicts in 1737
Conflicts in 1738
Conflicts in 1739
1737 in the Ottoman Empire
1738 in the Ottoman Empire
1739 in the Ottoman Empire
Serb rebellions against the Ottoman Empire
18th-century rebellions
Ottoman period in the history of Montenegro
18th century in Serbia
History of the Serbian Orthodox Church
Rebellions in Serbia
Rebellions in Montenegro
Serbs from the Ottoman Empire